False spiraea or false spirea is a common name for several plants and may refer to:

Astilbe Arendsii Group
Sorbaria sorbifolia, native to Asia